Smoler is a surname. Notable people with the surname include:

Harry Smoler (1911–1991), American politician
Jan Arnošt Smoler (1816–1884), Sorbian philologist and writer
Eliezer Smoler (1901–1985), Israeli writer

See also

Smolar

Occupational surnames